Columbus Historic District may refer to:

in the United States
(by state)
Columbus Historic District (Columbus, Georgia), listed on the NRHP in Georgia
Columbus Historic Riverfront Industrial District, Columbus, Georgia, listed on the NRHP in Georgia
Columbus Historic District (Columbus, Indiana), listed on the NRHP in Indiana
South Columbus Historic District, Columbus, Mississippi, listed on the NRHP in Mississippi
Columbus Downtown Historic District, Columbus, Wisconsin, listed on the NRHP in Wisconsin